Zagorye is a rural locality (a village) in Lavrovskoye Rural Settlement, Sudogodsky District, Vladimir Oblast, Russia. The population was 46 as of 2010.

Geography 
Zagorye is located 8 km northeast of Sudogda (the district's administrative centre) by road. Novoye Polkhovo is the nearest rural locality.

References 

Rural localities in Sudogodsky District